Admiral Frederick Byng Montresor (1811 – 15 December 1887) was a Royal Navy officer who went on to be Commander-in-Chief, East Indies & Cape of Good Hope Station.

Naval career
Montresor was made a lieutenant in the Royal Navy in 1835. 

He was promoted to Captain in 1857, he took command of HMS Calypso and sailed to Esquimalt in August 1858 to deal with American miners causing commotion in the Fraser River area.

In 1862, he transferred to the command of HMS Severn before being appointed Commander-in-Chief, East Indies & Cape of Good Hope Station in January 1865.

He was promoted to rear-admiral in 1867, and retired in 1870. In 1873, while on the retired list, he was further promoted to retired vice-admiral.

Family
He was son of General Thomas Gage Montresor, grandson of John Montresor and nephew of Henry Tucker Montresor. In 1851, he married Emily Delafield.

See also

References

1811 births
1887 deaths
Royal Navy admirals